Bryukhovetsky (masculine), Bryukhovetska (Ukrainian) or Bryukhovetskaya (Russian) (feminine) may refer to:

People
 Daria Briukhovetska, née Dolgorukova (1639—1669), Ukrainian Hetmansha by marriage to Hetman Ivan Briukhovetsky
 Ivan Briukhovetsky (Bryukhovetsky) (1623—1668), Ukrainian Hetman
  (born 1949), Ukrainian film critic, editor in chief of 
  (Vyacheslav Bryukhovetsky) (born 1947), Hero of Ukraine, Rector and President (1991—2007), since 2007 Honour President of Kyiv Mohyla Academy

Places
Bryukhovetsky District, a district in Krasnodar Krai, Russia
Bryukhovetskaya, a rural locality (a stanitsa) in Bryukhovetsky District of Krasnodar Krai, Russia